Google Labs was an incubator created by Google to test and publicly demonstrate new projects. It was online from early 2002 to mid-2011.

Google described Google Labs as "a playground where our more adventurous users can play around with prototypes of some of our wild and crazy ideas and offer feedback directly to the engineers who developed them."

History

Google also used an invitation-only model for users to test Labs products including Gmail, Google Calendar and Google Wave, and many of these also have their own "Labs" experimental features and previews. Labs was later removed from Google Calendar.

In 2006, all Google Labs products were presented with a consistent icon, a flask, and a gray title, as opposed to other color-coded Google products, such as Google News and Google Maps.

Discontinuation
In July 2011, Google announced that it was discontinuing Google Labs. 

Many of the experiments have been discontinued, although a few have moved to the main search pages or have been integrated into other products. Google still has many links to its defunct "Labs" tools in Google blogs that are readily accessible through a Google search.

In November 2021, the Google Labs brand was revived for an internal group at Google encompassing Google's AR and VR efforts, Area 120, as well as Project Starline.

References

Labs
Research organizations in the United States